In mathematical optimization, the perturbation function is any function which relates to primal and dual problems.  The name comes from the fact that any such function defines a perturbation of the initial problem.  In many cases this takes the form of shifting the constraints.

In some texts the value function is called the perturbation function, and the perturbation function is called the bifunction.

Definition 
Then given the function , we can define the primal problem by

If there are constraint conditions, these can be built into the function  by letting  where  is the characteristic function.  Then  is a perturbation function if and only if .

Use in duality 
The duality gap is the difference of the right and left hand side of the inequality

where  is the convex conjugate in both variables.

For any choice of perturbation function F weak duality holds. There are a number of conditions which if satisfied imply strong duality.

Examples

Lagrangian 
Let  and  be dual pairs.  Given a primal problem (minimize f(x)) and a related perturbation function (F(x,y)) then the Lagrangian  is the negative conjugate of F with respect to y (i.e. the concave conjugate).  That is the Lagrangian is defined by

In particular the weak duality minmax equation can be shown to be

If the primal problem is given by

where .  Then if the perturbation is given by

then the perturbation function is

Thus the connection to Lagrangian duality can be seen, as L can be trivially seen to be

Fenchel duality 

Let  and  be dual pairs.  Assume there exists a linear map  with adjoint operator . Assume the primal objective function  (including the constraints by way of the indicator function) can be written as  such that .  Then the perturbation function is given by
 

References 

Linear programming
Convex optimization